The Women's K-4 500 metres kayaking event at the 2019 Pan American Games was held on 28th of July at the Albufera Medio Mundo in the city of Huacho.

Results

Final

References

External links
Results

Canoeing at the 2019 Pan American Games